YMCA Baseball Team is a semi-historical 2002 South Korean comedy film.

In 1905, there was a confluence of international events leading to the loss of Chosŏn Korean sovereignty, and by 1910, Japan formally annexed Korea outright. The Japanese, having already defeated Qing China (1895) and signed an alliance with the United Kingdom (1902), defeated Imperial Russia (1905), and came to an understanding with the United States (the Taft-Katsura Agreement of 1905) to respect each other's colonial "Spheres of Influence" in the Pacific. In these chaotic times, an eclectic group of Koreans find refuge in the quintessentially American pastime.

Plot
The film plays out as a flashback, experienced by a young Korean boy, as he, like his great-great-grandfather prepares to play baseball. 
The flashback opens with the protagonist of the film, Yi Ho-chang, and his friend in a field. The two are supposed to be studying; however Yi Ho-chang is preoccupied with his soccer ball, which he accidentally kicks into a nearby property. Ho-chang climbs the gate to retrieve his ball, and finds himself within the walls of the American Christian missionary school. There he discovers a much smaller and harder ball, which he comically mistakes for his shrunken soccer ball. At this point a Christian missionary appears and explains to the confused Ho-chang that he is in fact holding a baseball. Ho-chang quickly flees the premise; however his fascination with the new sport ensures his return for further investigation. Ho-chang, accompanied by several interested Koreans return to the school to join the YMCA baseball league. 
The unlikely group, and their female coach, Min Jung-rim prove to be successful, and quickly become the pride of their town.

Throughout the film Ho-chang falls madly in love with his un-interested female coach, adding to the comic relief. One day while headed to practice the team is confronted by a group of Japanese soldiers, who claim that their practice ground is a new Japanese training camp. To settle the dispute one of the team members, Oh Dae-hyeon, who went to school in Tokyo with the Japanese Officer, suggests a competitive game of baseball. The game would not only settle the dispute, but it would also be a way for the Koreans to establish themselves against Japan, and for the players to further prove themselves to the skeptics of their town. Meanwhile, a more serious dispute is going on between the Korean diplomats and the revolutionary thinkers, over the signing of the Eulsa Treaty that officially made Korea a protectorate of Japan. Coincidentally, Oh Dae-hyeon and Min Jong-rim are members of the Anti-Eulsa League, an organization formed in protest of the Five Eulsa Traitors, which one of their teammate's, Kwang-tae, father belongs to. Due to all of the suppressed tension, the YMCA team loses to the Japanese, also losing their chance to dignify themselves in the face of their suppressors. 
Devastated over the loss, the team members decide to abandon baseball and return to more practical roles in society. Ho-chang fulfills his fathers wish and takes over the family school, despite his desires to become a great baseball player. In the end, the team reunites for one final and quite dramatic rematch against the Japanese. The Koreans victory in this rematch symbolizes their unity in baseball, and their ability to come together despite the social and cultural issues facing the changing country.

Cast
Song Kang-ho as Lee Ho-chang, the son of a yangban scholar.
Kim Hye-soo as Min Jong-rim, the Western educated female coach and teacher at the YMCA school.
Kim Joo-hyuk as Oh Dae-hyeon, a Japanese educated member of the team.
Hwang Jung-min as Ryu Kwang-tae, the son of a pro-Japanese official.
Kazuma Suzuki as Hideo Nomura, the leader of Japanese team.
Shin Goo as Ho-chang's father, the traditional head of a Confucian school.
Cho Seung-woo as Young coachman (Cameo)
 Choi Deok-moon as Lee Eun

Historical relationship

The film is a comically enhanced interpretation of the historical events of the first Korean baseball team during early 1905. The events, which took place prior to the film, denote what took place historically and how a Japanese occupation came to Korea are listed as follows. The forceful opening of Japanese connections by the Americans between 1852 and 1854 by Commodore Matthew Perry had caused an internal restructuring of government by the Japanese known as the Meiji Restoration that began in 1868. Prior to Perry's arrival, the Japanese would only permit trade with the Dutch (East India Company) and any foreigner found in Japanese territory was, in most cases, promptly executed, often by beheading. During the Meiji restoration, Japanese focused on industrialization of Japan to reignite the Imperial glory of Japan, a country also known as Nippon. As with most imperial governments of the early 20th century, militarization and conquest through industrial and technological prowess ensured a place in the handful of nations that took part in global leadership. At the time, Britain was one of the most powerful nations on Earth and had the best Navy. Russia's government, an autocracy ruled by Czar Nicholas II, had been undergoing industrial development some years and now Russia was making way to expand its borders. As vast as Russia's territory is, most of its population lives in the warmer western borders of the nation. Between 1897 and 1898, Russia had arrived in Port Arthur, Manchuria and succeeded in securing a lease with the Chinese to use the harbor. China at that time was under the bindings of a non-exclusivity agreement with what was then known as the Great British Empire that forbade them to purchase goods from other countries. This agreement also led to the Boxer rebellion that ended in 1901. China had become rather weak after the Ming Dynasty and continually made concessions to foreign nations in trade rights and permission to settle inside its borders. Thus, it was taken for an easy target by many foreign nations, including Russia and Japan. Japan has had a historically unpleasant sentiment towards for China and Korea and with the Meiji restoration and militaristic buildup of Japanese forces, Japan sought to expand its borders much like Russia did. The western nations were extending each of their hands and negotiating or conquering more territory and resources. In almost direct relation to the west, Japan flexed its imperial capacity as well. Korea was a buffer zone between Japan and the Chinese mainland and provide an access conduit to all measure of logistical and consumable resources. If Japan was able to hold control or sovereignty over Korea, it would tactically ensure the safety of the Japanese homeland from attack and therefore was considered a highly valuable asset. In 1875, Japan had forced Korea to declare itself as an independent nation apart from China through force and open its borders. Korea traditionally had been a protectorate nation under Chinese authority. Over time after it became clear what this meant for Korea and China, Qing China attempted to recant the declaration against Japan and in August 1894 Japan began fighting with Qing (Chin) forces over the Korean Peninsula, known as the First Sino-Chinese war (1894–1895).

The film YMCA Baseball takes places after these events have occurred and Japan has occupied Korea as a protectorate state of Japan. The Japanese have a highly invested interest in maintaining control of Korea and make every attempt to prohibit any inkling of resistance or possibility of uprising by the Korean people as portrayed by the film although somewhat overly exuberant. Korea's future lay uncertain and coincided with national sentiment of oppression towards the Japanese. With the Chosun dynasty ending and large western and other foreign influence there were two sentiments shared among the Korea people. Korea could either modernize or go back to the traditional ways of its historic past. Westerners and Japanese had made settlements in Korea; Missionary schools and military outposts respectively, and took full advantage of the fact Korea was in the midst of the twilight of its greatest dynasty, the Chosen. With the West to traveling and settling Asia, western culture and customs spread in turn. As the film's title states, YMCA baseball was a part of this divergence. George Williams founded the YMCA on June 6, 1844, in London, England; YMCA is an acronym for Young Men's Christian Association that began among evangelists. Known for its promotion of sports, it was actually also a missionary organization in conjunction with the Church and run locally and this would most likely have been encouraged even as far away as Korea. Baseball was first introduced in Korea in 1905 by Phillip L. Gillett, a missionary who introduced the sport to members of a YMCA in Seoul. Western missionaries of the YMCA colluded with the Japanese to abolish traditional Korean values and indoctrinate Korean youths to Japanese values and customs. This led many Koreans to study in Tokyo and this is represented by a few characters in the film. Indoctrination of the youth would steer Korea in the direction of modernization; Japan had been undergoing a surge of industrial production and western adoption and the West had already gone through several phases of industrialization. By subverting the youth of Korea to fall in line with more modern and foreign sentiments, in a way ensured the future relations with Korea and the inevitable outcome of this is a struggle between traditional Korean culture and values, and that of new influence. The remark about the Japanese first encountering baseball some thirty years earlier however, was accurate (1872).

Historical references
The Japanese general bears a striking resemblance to the last  Resident-general of Korea, and later Governor-general, Terauchi Masatake.

In the Film, there is a funeral service for a close relative of Jung-rim, who was supposed to be related to the late, Queen Min. The relative had committed suicide in protest to the Eulsa Treaty, this is supposed to be Min Yonghwan (1861–1905), the military attache of King Kojong.

See also 
 Baseball in South Korea
 Glove (film)
 Perfect Game (2011 film)

References

External links

South Korean sports comedy films
2002 films
2000s Korean-language films
2000s sports comedy films
Myung Films films
YMCA
2002 comedy films
South Korean films based on actual events
Films set in Korea under Japanese rule
2000s South Korean films